This is a list of Belgian provinces and the Region of Brussels by Human Development Index as of 2021.

See also 
 List of Belgian provinces by GDP

References 

Human Development Index
Belgium
Belgium, Human Development Index